The St. Petersburg Women's Open was a golf tournament on the LPGA Tour from 1954 to 1989. It was played at three different courses in the St. Petersburg, Florida area.

LPGA Hall of Fame member Kathy Whitworth won the tournament five times (1965, 1968–70, and 1974). Only three other players have won the same LPGA tournament on five occasions.

Tournament locations

Winners
USX Golf Classic
1989 Betsy King
1988 Rosie Jones

S&H Golf Classic
1987 Cindy Hill
1986 Pat Bradley
1985 Alice Miller
1984 Vicki Fergon
1983 Hollis Stacy
1982 Hollis Stacy
1981 JoAnne Carner
1980 Dot Germain

Orange Blossom Classic
1979 Jane Blalock
1978 Jane Blalock
1977 Judy Rankin
1976 JoAnne Carner
1975 Amy Alcott
1974 Kathy Whitworth
1973 Sandra Haynie
1972 Carol Mann
1971 Jan Ferraris
1970 Kathy Whitworth

Orange Blossom Open
1969 Kathy Whitworth

St. Petersburg Orange Blossom Open
1968 Kathy Whitworth

St. Petersburg Orange Classic
1967 Marilynn Smith

St. Petersburg Women's Open
1966 Marilynn Smith

St. Petersburg Open
1965 Kathy Whitworth

St. Petersburg Women's Open Invitational
1964 Mary Lena Faulk

St. Petersburg Women's Open
1963 Mickey Wright

St. Petersburg Open
1962 Louise Suggs
1961 Mickey Wright
1960 Beverly Hanson
1959 Louise Suggs
1958 Betsy Rawls
1957 Mary Lena Faulk
1956 Kathy Cornelius
1955 Patty Berg
1954 Beverly Hanson

Notes and references

External links
 Tournament results (1963-1989) at Golfobserver.com

Former LPGA Tour events
Golf in Florida
Sports competitions in St. Petersburg, Florida
Recurring sporting events established in 1954
Recurring sporting events disestablished in 1989
1954 establishments in Florida
1989 disestablishments in Florida
Women's sports in Florida